Urda may refer to:
 Urd (Norse mythology), of which Urda is an alternative spelling
 167 Urda, an asteroid
 Urdă, a Romanian and Macedonian cheese
 Urda (anime), an anime about time travel and Nazis
 Urda (journal), a Norwegian antiquities and history journal 
 Urda, Toledo, a Spanish municipality
 Urda Arneberg (1929–2000), Norwegian actress